Frielas is a former civil parish in the municipality of Loures, Lisbon District, Portugal. In 2013, the parish merged into the new parish Santo António dos Cavaleiros e Frielas. Frielas has an area of 5.63 km2, 2676 inhabitants according to the census made in 2001 and a density of 475 inhabitants per km2.

References

Former parishes of Loures